In the theory of random matrices, the circular ensembles are  measures on  spaces of unitary matrices introduced by Freeman Dyson as modifications of the Gaussian matrix ensembles. The three main examples are the circular orthogonal ensemble (COE) on symmetric unitary matrices, the circular unitary ensemble (CUE) on unitary matrices, and  the circular symplectic ensemble (CSE) on self dual unitary quaternionic  matrices.

Probability distributions

The distribution of the unitary circular ensemble CUE(n) is the Haar measure on the unitary group U(n). If U is a random element of CUE(n), then UTU is a random element of COE(n); if U is a random element of CUE(2n), then URU is a random element of CSE(n), where 

In the CSE each of these n eigenvalues appears twice. The distributions have densities with respect to the eigenangles, given by
 
The normalisation constant Zn,β is given by
 
as can be verified via Selberg's integral formula, or Weyl's integral formula for compact Lie groups.

Generalizations

Generalizations of the circular ensemble restrict the matrix elements of U to real numbers [so that U is in the orthogonal group O(n)] or to real quaternion numbers [so that U is in the symplectic group Sp(2n). The Haar measure on the orthogonal group produces the circular real ensemble (CRE) and the Haar measure on the symplectic group produces the circular quaternion ensemble (CQE).

For n=2m even and det U=1, there are no fixed eigenvalues and the phases θk have probability distribution
 
with C an unspecified normalization constant. For n=2m+1 odd there is one fixed eigenvalue σ=det U equal to ±1. The phases have distribution
 
For n=2m+2 even and det U=-1 there is a pair of eigenvalues fixed at +1 and -1, while the phases have distribution
 
This is also the distribution of the eigenvalues of a matrix in Sp(2m).
 
These probability density functions are referred to as Jacobi distributions in the theory of random matrices, because correlation functions can be expressed in terms of Jacobi polynomials.

Calculations

Averages of products of matrix elements in the circular ensembles can be calculated using Weingarten functions. For large dimension of the matrix these calculations become impractical, and a numerical method is advantageous. There exist efficient algorithms to generate random matrices in the circular ensembles, for example by performing a QR decomposition on a Ginibre matrix.

References

Software Implementations

External links 

Random matrices
Mathematical physics
Freeman Dyson